Globalizations is a peer-reviewed academic journal covering global politics and international political economy. It was established in 2004 and is published by Taylor & Francis. The editor-in-chief is Barry Gills (University of Helsinki).

Abstracting and indexing
The journal is abstracted and indexed in:

 EBSCOhost
 International Bibliography of the Social Sciences
 Sociological Abstracts
 CSA Worldwide Political Science Abstracts
 PAIS International
 Social Sciences Citation Index.

According to the Journal Citation Reports, the journal has a 2019 impact factor of 1.614.

References

External links

Political science journals
Publications established in 2004
English-language journals
Taylor & Francis academic journals
7 times per year journals